Djedkare Shemai may have been an ancient Egyptian pharaoh during the Eighth Dynasty of the First Intermediate Period. His name is only attested on the Abydos King List, as the Abydos King List is the primary source for identifying seventh/eighth dynasties (combined). No contemporary document or building with his name has been found.

References

External links 
VIIth Dynasty 2175 - 2165, Accessed November 9, 2006.
Abydos King List, Accessed November 9, 2006.

22nd-century BC Pharaohs
Pharaohs of the Eighth Dynasty of Egypt